Sirijam is a village in Cheedikada mandal, Anakapalli district Andhrapradesh, India.

Location: Longitude- 82°52'10.04"E, Latitude-  17°55'58.81"N

Pincode: 531028

Villages in Anakapalli district